Tuwaiq Club is a Saudi Arabian football club based in Al Zulfi and competes in the Saudi Second Division, the third tier of Saudi football. The club was founded in 1964 by Sulaiman Al-Saif and its first president was Ali bin Ahmed Al-Eid. The club is named after the Tuwaiq mountain in Najd. Tuwaiq won their second promotion to the Saudi Second Division during the 2020–21 season after reaching the semi-finals of the Saudi Third Division. They previously played in the first edition of the Second Division in 1976–77. The club also consists of various other departments including karate, weightlifting, futsal, and volleyball.

Current squad 
As of 1 August 2021:

References

External links

Football clubs in Saudi Arabia
Football clubs in Al Zulfi
1964 establishments in Saudi Arabia
Association football clubs established in 1964